The women's high jump was an event at the 1956 Summer Olympics in Melbourne, Australia. The qualification round mark was set at 1.58 metres. Just one athlete, Ann Marie Flynn from the United States, did not surpass that height in the morning qualification round.

Final classification

References

External links
 Official Report
 Results

W
High jump at the Olympics
1956 in women's athletics
Ath